Transmembrane Protein 176B, or TMEM176B is a transmembrane protein that in humans is encoded by the TMEM176B gene. It is thought to play a role in the process of maturation of dendritic cells.

Gene

Location 
TMEM176B is also known as LR8, and MS4B2. The gene is found on the minus end of Chromosome 7, on the long arm at position 7q36.1. The starting position of the gene is at 150,791,287 and goes to 150,801,360. It has 10,074 base pairs and has a total of 11 exons.

Gene 
TMEM176A and LOC105375566 is a neighbor of TMEM176B.

Expression 
The gene is found to be most expressed in the liver with the kidney being the second most expressed tissue.

Transcript variants 
There are 3 isoforms (A, B, C) of this gene with variants of isoform A and C. Isoform A variant 1 has 1444 nucleotides that encode 270 amino acids. There are 17 alternatively spliced variants with 1 unspliced transcript variant.

Homology

Paralogs
There is one paralog of TMEM176B which is TMEM176A.

Orthologs 

Below is a table of orthologs of TMEM176B, these include close and somewhat distant orthologs.

There are around 125 orthologs of the gene ranging from primates to mice and to certain species of fish.

Homologs
The homologs of this gene include chimpanzee, Rhesus monkey, dog, cow, mouse, and rat.

Protein 

The molecular weight of TMEM176B is 29.1 kiloDaltons (kdal). The protein is rich in valine and poor in aspartic acid.  There are 4 transmembrane regions within TMEM176B isoform a. There is a CD20 domain from 198-687.

Domains
The CD20-like family includes the CD20 gene but is part of the family pfam04103 which is part of superfamily cl04401. This specific domain region is 489 bp.

Secondary structure
TMEM176B is composed of alpha helices, beta strands and TM helices.  The Alpha helices make up most of the secondary structure followed by TM helices.

Subcellular localization
Mainly localized to the Golgi apparatus but is additionally localized to the plasma membrane and nucleoplasm.

Protein-protein interactions 
The protein interacts most commonly with TMEM176A. It also interacts with TMEM47 and CPXM1 (carboxypeptidase 1) but at lower levels.

Regulation

Gene 
There are 11 promoters in TMEM176B. The promoter region before isoform a is 1101 bp and covers 150,799,077-150,800,177.

Protein 
There are 4 phosphorylation sites in TMEM176B isoform a.

Clinical significance 

There has been research that indicates that TMEM176B is associated with cancer when an abnormal of the gene accumulates.

References